Regeling v Bestuur van de Bedrijfsvereniging voor de Metaalnijverheid (1999) C-125/97 is a European insolvency law and labour law case, concerning the protection of employees' salaries on their employer's insolvency.

Facts
Mr Regeling was a Dutch welder. He received sporadic pay from January 1991 until August 1991 when with notice the contract was terminated and the employer went bankrupt. He claimed pay from the Bestuur van de Bedrijfsvereniging voor de Metaalnijverheid, the guarantee institution for employee's claims in the Netherlands. This was turned down because the period guaranteed was 13 weeks before termination, and in that period, making up for prior shortfalls, more than normal wages were paid.

Judgment
The European Court of Justice held that Mr Regeling still had a good claim, because the employers late payments should be set off first against the outstanding wage debt. To do otherwise would undermine the minimum protection of the guarantee.

See also

Notes

References

European Union company case law
1998 in the European Union
Dutch case law
Court of Justice of the European Union case law
1998 in case law
1998 in the Netherlands
European Union labour case law